Benjamín Mora Mendívil (born 25 June 1979) is a Mexican professional football manager who is the head coach of Atlas. With Johor Darul Ta'zim, he won the Malaysian Super League title in 2021.

Early life 
Mora described his early life as "nomadic" as he lived in several cities and moved about 20 times. His father, Benjamín Mora Mercado, was a businessman and wrestling promoter. His mother, María Antonieta Mendívil, was a national volleyball player in the 1970s.

Career
Mora started his coaching career in 2011 with Tijuana Reserves in the Mexican lower divisions, before becoming manager of Atlético Chiapas in 2014. Between 2012 and 2015, he also served as an assistant coach at various Mexican clubs, including Querétaro, Atlante and Cafetaleros de Tapachula.

In December 2015, Mora was appointed manager of JDT II, the reserve team of Johor Darul Ta'zim (JDT), for the 2016 season. In January 2017, Mora took the vacant manager position of the main JDT team after Mario Gómez left the club.

In April 2022, JDT, managed by Mora, became the first Malaysian team to reach the round of 16 of the AFC Champions League after defeating Ulsan Hyundai 2–1 at Sultan Ibrahim Stadium. He resigned as manager on 27 July 2022 due to personal reasons.

On 6 October 2022, Mora returned to Mexico and signed with Liga MX side Atlas, replacing Diego Cocca.

Honours

Manager
Johor Darul Ta'zim 
 Malaysia Super League: 2021
 Malaysia Charity Shield: 2021, 2022

References

1979 births
Living people
Sportspeople from Mexico City
Mexican football managers
Mexican expatriates in Malaysia
Liga MX managers
Malaysia Super League managers
Mexican expatriate football managers
Expatriate football managers in Malaysia
Atlas F.C. managers